KALQ-FM (93.5 MHz) is a radio station broadcasting a country music format. Licensed to Alamosa, Colorado, United States, the station is currently owned by William Spears, Jr. through licensee Wolf Creek Broadcasting, LLC, and features programming from Citadel Broadcasting and Westwood One.

References

External links
 
 

ALQ-FM
Radio stations established in 1985
1985 establishments in Colorado